HNLMS Abraham Crijnssen is a  of the Royal Netherlands Navy (RNN). 

Built during the 1930s, she was based in the Netherlands East Indies when Japan attacked at the end of 1941. Ordered to retreat to Australia, the ship was disguised as a tropical island to avoid detection, and was the last Dutch ship to escape from the region. On arriving in Australia in 1942, she was commissioned into the Royal Australian Navy (RAN) as HMAS Abraham Crijnssen and operated as an anti-submarine escort. Although returned to RNN control in 1943, the ship remained in Australian waters for most of World War II. After the war, Abraham Crijnssen operated on anti-revolution patrols in the East Indies, before returning to the Netherlands and being converted into a boom defence ship in 1956. 

Removed from service in 1960, the vessel was donated to the Netherlands Sea Cadet Corps for training purposes. In 1995, Abraham Crijnssen was acquired by the Dutch Navy Museum for preservation as a museum ship.

Design and construction
Abraham Crijnssen was the third of eight s constructed for the RNN during the late 1930s. Built by Werf Gusto at their yard in Schiedam, South Holland, the minesweeper was launched on 22 September 1936, and commissioned into the RNN on 26 May 1937. She was named after 17th century naval commander Abraham Crijnssen.

The minesweepers were fitted with two Yarrow 3-drum boilers and two Stork triple expansion engines, which provided  to two propeller shafts, allowing the ship to reach . Abraham Crijnssen was armed with a single 3-inch gun, and two Oerlikon 20 mm cannon, plus a payload of depth charges. The standard ship's company was 45.

Operational history

Early service
The ship was based at Surabaya in the Netherlands East Indies when Japan invaded in 1941. Following the Allied defeats at the Battles of the Java Sea and Sunda Strait in late February 1942, all Allied ships were ordered to withdraw to Australia. Abraham Crijnssen was meant to sail with three other warships, but found herself proceeding alone.

To escape detection by Japanese aircraft (which the minesweeper did not have the armament to defend effectively against), the ship was heavily camouflaged with jungle foliage, giving the impression of a small island. Personnel cut down trees and branches from nearby islands, and arranged the cuttings to form a jungle canopy covering as much of the ship as possible. Any hull still exposed was painted to resemble rocks and cliffs. To further the illusion, the ship would remain close to shore, anchored and immobile during daylight, and only sail at night. She headed for Fremantle, Western Australia, where she arrived on 20 March 1942; Abraham Crijnssen was the last vessel to successfully escape Java, and the only ship of her class in the region to survive.

RAN service
After arriving in Australian waters, the minesweeper underwent a refit, which included the installation of new ASDIC equipment. On 28 September, the minesweeper was commissioned into the RAN as HMAS Abraham Crijnssen. She was reclassified as an anti-submarine convoy escort, and was also used as a submarine tender for the Dutch submarines that relocated to Australia following the Japanese conquest. The ship's Dutch sailors were supplemented with survivors from the British destroyer  and Australian personnel, all under the command of an Australian lieutenant. The wardroom tradition of hanging a portrait of the commissioned ship's reigning monarch led to some tension before it was decided to leave Queen Wilhelmina of the Netherlands on the bulkhead instead of replacing her with King George VI of the United Kingdom, which was installed in the lieutenant's cabin.

While escorting a convoy to Sydney through Bass Strait on 26 January 1943, Abraham Crijnssen detected a submarine on ASDIC. The convoy was ordered to scatter, while Abraham Crijnssen and  depth charged the submarine contact. No wreckage of the suspected submarine was found. A pair of hastily released depth charges at the start of the engagement damaged the minesweeper; several fittings and pipes were damaged, and all of her centreline rivets had to be replaced during a week-long dry-docking.

Return to RNN
Abraham Crijnssen was returned to RNN service on 5 May 1943, but remained in Australian waters for most of World War II. On 7 June 1945, the minesweeper left Sydney for Darwin, with the oil lighter (and former submarine) K9 in tow. On 8 June, the tow cable snapped, and K9 washed ashore at Seal Rocks, New South Wales.

Abraham Crijnssen was used for mine-clearing sweeps of Kupang Harbour prior to the arrival of a RAN force to accept the Japanese surrender of Timor.

Post-war
After World War II, the minesweeper was used on anti-revolution patrols of the Netherlands East Indies. She left for the Netherlands in August 1951, and was converted into a boom defence vessel in March 1956.

Decommissioning and preservation

The ship was removed from the Navy List in 1960. After leaving service, Abraham Crijnssen was donated to the Sea Cadet Corps (Zeekadetkorps Nederland) for training purposes. She was docked at The Hague from 1962 to 1972, after which she was moved to Rotterdam. The ship was also used as a storage hulk during this time.

In 1995, Abraham Crijnssen was marked for preservation by the Dutch Navy Museum at Den Helder. She was retrofitted to her wartime configuration.

Citations

References

Books

Websites

External links

 
 
 Abraham Crijnssen at the Dutch Naval Museum (Dutch)

Jan van Amstel-class minesweepers
1936 ships
World War II minesweepers of the Netherlands
World War II minesweepers of Australia
Museum ships in the Netherlands
Minesweepers of the Royal Australian Navy
Ships built by Gusto Shipyard